Nathan for You is an American docu-reality comedy television series starring Canadian comedian Nathan Fielder. The series was created by Fielder and Michael Koman and premiered on February 28, 2013, on the American cable television network Comedy Central. In the series, Fielder plays an off-kilter version of himself, who tries to use his business background and life experiences to help struggling companies and people by offering them outlandish strategies.

The last of the 32 episodes of Nathan for You aired on November 9, 2017. On October 17, 2018, Comedy Central announced the show would not return for a fifth season.

Series overview

Episodes

Season 1 (2013)

Season 2 (2014)

Season 3 (2015)

Special (2017)

Season 4 (2017)

References

External links
 
 

Lists of American comedy television series episodes
Lists of American non-fiction television series episodes